Vacarme is a Canadian drama film, directed by Neegan Trudel and released in 2020. The film stars Rosalie Pépin as Émilie, a 13 year old girl who is placed in a group home by Quebec's child protective services after a conflict with her mother Karine (Sophie Desmarais).

The film premiered in November 2020 at the Cinemania film festival.

The film received two Canadian Screen Award nominations at the 9th Canadian Screen Awards in 2021, for Best Actress (Pépin) and the John Dunning Best First Feature Award.

References

External links

2020 films
2020 drama films
Canadian drama films
Quebec films
2020s French-language films
French-language Canadian films
2020s Canadian films